Workneh Gebeyehu Negewo (born 16 July 1968) is an Ethiopian politician. In September 2012, he was appointed Ministry of Transport and he has served as an elected member of Addis Ababa City Council.

Career
He studied BA in Political Science and International Relations (1991) and MA in International Relations (2006) at Addis Ababa University. He has been a member of Oromo People's Democratic Organization and EPRDF (Since 2019 the Prosperity Party) since 1991 and an executive member of both parties since 2012 and commissioner general of the Ethiopian Federal Police Commission from 2001 to 2012. Since 1 November 2016 he had served as Minister of Foreign Affairs following a cabinet reshuffle, succeeding Tedros Adhanom, before he was appointed as the 6th Executive Secretary of IGAD in November 2019.

See also
List of foreign ministers in 2017
List of current foreign ministers

References

21st-century Ethiopian politicians
Foreign ministers of Ethiopia
Government ministers of Ethiopia
1968 births
Living people
Addis Ababa University alumni
University of South Africa alumni
Oromo Democratic Party politicians
People from Oromia Region
Oromo people